Within Dividia is the second album released by Canadian mathcore band The End.

Track listing
 "These Walls" – 4:41
 "Fetesque" – 3:55
 "The Sense of Reverence" – 3:04
 "The Scent of Elegance" – 3:13
 "Organelle (In She We Lust)" – 4:11
 "Dear Martyr" – 3:43
 "Orthodox Unparalleled" – 5:25
 "Of Fist and Flame" – 5:19

References

The End (Canadian band) albums
2004 albums
Relapse Records albums